ʻAbd al-Hādī (ALA-LC romanization of ) is a Muslim male given name, and in modern usage, surname. It is built from the Arabic words ʻabd and al-Hādī, one of the names of God in the Qur'an, which give rise to the Muslim theophoric names. It means "servant of the Guide".

It may refer to:

Given name
Sheikh 'Abd al-Hadi Aqhili, one of the names used by Ivan Aguéli (1869-1917), Swedish Sufi painter and author
Abdul Hadi Abdul Hamid (born 1987), Malaysian footballer
Abdul Hadi Arghandiwal (born 1952), Afghan politician
Abdul Hadi Awang (born 1947), Malaysian politician
Abdul Haddi Bin Hadiddi (born 1969), Tunisian held in Guantanamo
Abdul Hadi Dawai (1894-1982), Afghan poet and diplomat
Abd Al Hadi Omar Mahmoud Faraj (born ca. 1981), Syrian held in Guantanamo
Abdel Hadi Al Gazzar (1925–1966), Egyptian painter
Abdelhadi Habassa (born 1976), Moroccan runner
Abdulhadi Al Hariri (born 1982), Syrian footballer
Abdul Hadi al Iraqi (born 1961), Iraqi terrorist held in Guantanamo
Abdel Hadi Kandil (born 1935), Egyptian chemist and politician
Abdulhadi Khalaf (born 1945), Bahraini political activist
Abdulhadi Khalaf (footballer) (born 1986), Syrian footballer
Abdulhadi Alkhawaja (born 1962), Bahraini political activist
Abdel-Hadi Al-Maharmeh (born 1983), Jordanian footballer
Abdel Hadi Mahbooba (died 2005), Iraqi academic
Abdulhadi Isa Omran (born 1962), Egyptian medical professor
Abdul Hadi Palazzi, leader of Italian Muslim Assembly
Abdelhadi Said (born 1974), Moroccan poet
Abdulhadi Abdallah Ibrahim al Sharakh (born 1982), Saudi held in Guananamo
Abdul Hady Talukdar, Bangladeshi academic administrator, educationalist
Abdelhadi Tazi (1921–2015), Moroccan diplomat
Abdul Hadi Yahya (born 1985), Malaysian footballer
Abd al-Hadi al-Shirazi
Abd al-Hadi al-Fadli

Surname 
Awni Abd al-Hadi (1889-1970), Palestinian politician
Amin Abd al-Hadi (1897–1967), Palestinian politician
Bouchaib Abdelhadi, Moroccan musician
Mahdi Abdul Hadi (born 1944), Palestinian lawyer
Laakkad Abdelhadi (born 1977), Moroccan footballer
Medhat Abdel-Hady (born 1974), Egyptian footballer
Tarab Abdul Hadi (1910–1976), Palestinian Muslim activist and feminist
Zain Abdul Hady (born 1956), Egyptian journalist and novelist

References

Arabic masculine given names